Our Country may refer to:
 Our Country (film), a 2006 drama film starring Valeria Golino
 Our Country: Its Possible Future and Its Present Crisis, a book written by Protestant cleric Josiah Strong
 "Our Country", a song performed by John Mellencamp featured on his 2007 album Freedom's Road
 Our Country (documentary), a 2003 documentary on country music